A papal renunciation also called a papal abdication, occurs when the reigning pope of the Catholic Church voluntarily steps down from his position. As the reign of the pope has conventionally been from election until death, papal renunciation is an uncommon event. Before the 21st century, only five popes unambiguously resigned with historical certainty, all between the 10th and 15th centuries. Additionally, there are disputed claims of four popes having resigned, dating from the 3rd to the 11th centuries; a fifth disputed case may have involved an antipope.

Additionally, a few popes during the saeculum obscurum were "deposed", meaning driven from office by force. The history and canonical question here is complicated; generally, the official Vatican list of popes seems to recognize such "depositions" as valid renunciations if the pope acquiesced, but not if he did not. The later development of canon law has been in favor of papal supremacy, leaving no recourse to the removal of a pope involuntarily.

The most recent pope to resign was Benedict XVI, who vacated the Holy See on 28 February 2013, the date of his effective resignation. He was the first pope to do so since Gregory XII in 1415.

Despite its common usage in discussion of papal renunciations, the term abdication is not used in the official documents of the church for renunciation by a pope.

Modern procedure 
In the Catholic Church, in the Latin Rite, the official laws on all matters are codified in the Latin edition of the 1983 Code of Canon Law. This regulates papal renunciations in canon 332 §2, where it states:

 Si contingat ut Romanus Pontifex muneri suo renuntiet, ad validitatem requiritur ut renuntiatio libere fiat et rite manifestetur, non vero ut a quopiam acceptetur. (In English: If it happens that the Roman Pontiff resigns his office, it is required for validity that the resignation be made freely and properly manifested but not that it is accepted by anyone.)

This corresponds to canon 221 of the 1917 Code of Canon Law, which in Latin is:

 Si contingat ut Romanus Pontifex renuntiet, ad eiusdem renuntiationis validitatem non est necessaria Cardinalium aliorumve acceptatio. (In English: If it happens that the Roman Pontiff resigns his office, it is not required for validity that the resignation is accepted by the Cardinals or by anyone else.)

Both the 1983 code and the 1917 code make explicit that there is no particular individual or body of people to whom the pope must manifest his renunciation. This addresses a concern raised in earlier centuries, specifically by 18th-century canonist Lucius Ferraris, who held that the College of Cardinals or at least its Dean must be informed, since the cardinals must be absolutely certain that the pope has renounced the dignity before they can validly proceed to elect a successor.

In 1996, Pope John Paul II, in his Apostolic Constitution Universi Dominici gregis, anticipated the possibility of resignation when he specified that the procedures he set out in that document should be observed "even if the vacancy of the Apostolic See should occur as a result of the resignation of the Supreme Pontiff".

History
The Catholic Encyclopedia notes the historically obscure renunciations of Pontian (230–235) and Marcellinus (296–308), the historically postulated renunciation of Liberius (352–366), and mentions that one (unspecified) catalogue of popes lists John XVIII as resigning office in 1009 and finishing his life as a monk.

11th century
The first historically unquestionable papal renunciation is that of Benedict IX in 1045. Benedict had also previously been deposed by Sylvester III in 1044, and though he returned to take up the office again the next year, the Vatican considers Sylvester III to have been a legitimate pope in the intervening months (meaning that Benedict IX must be considered to have validly resigned by acquiescing to the deposition in 1044). Then, in 1045, having regained the papacy for a few months, in order to rid the church of the scandalous Benedict, Gregory VI gave Benedict "valuable possessions" to resign the papacy in his favour. Gregory himself resigned in 1046 because the arrangement he had entered into with Benedict could have been considered simony. Gregory was followed by Clement II, and when Clement died, Benedict IX returned to be elected to the papacy for a third time, only to resign yet again before dying in a monastery. He thus reigned as pope for three non-consecutive terms, and resigned (or was deposed) three separate times.

Celestine V 
A well-known renunciation of a pope is that of Celestine V, in 1294. After only five months as pope, he issued a solemn decree declaring it permissible for a pope to resign, and then did so himself. He lived two more years as a hermit and then prisoner of his successor Boniface VIII, and was later canonised. Celestine's decree, and Boniface concurring (not revoking it), ended any doubt among canonists about the possibility of a valid papal renunciation.

Western Schism 
Gregory XII (1406–1415) resigned in 1415 in order to end the Western Schism, which had reached the point where there were three claimants to the papal throne: Roman Pope Gregory XII, Avignon Antipope Benedict XIII, and Pisan Antipope John XXIII. Before resigning, he formally convened the already existing Council of Constance and authorized it to elect his successor.

Benedict XVI

Benedict XVI's renunciation of the papacy took effect on 28 February 2013 at 20:00 (8:00 pm) CET (19:00 UTC), after being announced on the morning of 11 February by the Vatican. He was the first pope to relinquish the office since Gregory XII resigned to end the Western Schism in 1415 and the first to do so on his own initiative since Celestine V in 1294. His action was unexpected, given that the modern era popes have held the position from election until death. He said he was motivated by his declining health due to old age. The conclave to select his successor began on 12 March 2013 and elected Cardinal Jorge Mario Bergoglio, Archbishop of Buenos Aires, who took the name Francis.

List of papal renunciations

Conditional renunciations not put into effect 
Before setting out for Paris to crown Napoleon in 1804, Pope Pius VII (1800–1823) signed a document of renunciation to take effect if he were imprisoned in France.

During World War II, Pope Pius XII drew up a document ordering that his resignation take effect immediately if he were kidnapped by the Nazis, as was thought likely in August 1943. It was thought that the College of Cardinals would evacuate to a neutral country, perhaps Portugal, and elect his successor.

According to longtime curial official Cardinal Giovanni Battista Re, Pope Paul VI handwrote two letters in the late 1960s or 1970, well before his death, in anticipation of an incapacitating illness. One letter was addressed to the College of Cardinals, the other to the Secretary of State, whose name was not specified. Pope John Paul II showed them to Re, and they were shown to Pope Benedict XVI in 2003. In 2018, Paul's letter dated 2 May 1965 and addressed to the dean of the College of Cardinals was published. He wrote that "In case of infirmity, which is believed to be incurable or is of long duration and which impedes us from sufficiently exercising the functions of our apostolic ministry; or in the case of another serious and prolonged impediment", he renounced his office "both as bishop of Rome as well as head of the same holy Catholic Church".

Pope John Paul II wrote a letter in 1989 offering to resign if he became incapacitated. The first said that if ill health or some other unforeseen difficulty prevented him from "sufficiently carrying out the functions of my apostolic ministry … I renounce my sacred and canonical office, both as bishop of Rome as well as head of the holy Catholic Church." In 1994 he wrote a document that he apparently planned to read aloud, which explained that he had determined he could not resign merely because of age, as other bishops are required to do, but only "in the presence of an incurable illness or an impediment", and that he would therefore continue in office. He prayed in his will, written in 2000, that God "would help me to recognise how long I must continue this service", suggesting that renunciation was possible. In the weeks before his death in 2005, there was press speculation that John Paul might resign because of his failing health.

Incapacitation 
Canon law makes no provision for a pope being incapacitated by reason of health, either temporarily or permanently; nor does it specify what body has the authority to certify that the pope is incapacitated. It does state that "When the Roman See is vacant, or completely impeded, no innovation is to be made in the governance of the universal Church."

See also 
 Sede vacante
 Jewish pope Andreas, a Jewish legend about a Jewish boy in the Middle Ages from the German town of Mainz who is kidnaped while asleep, told his parents had died, converts to Catholicism, becomes a priest and is elected Pope but then engineers a meeting with Mainz Jews, discovers his rabbi father is still alive when he appears, before admitting to his father that he is his long-lost son, abdicates from the papacy, converts back to Judaism and moves back to Mainz.

References

Works cited

Abdication
Catholic Church legal terminology
Holy See
Papal